John Arnot Jr. (March 11, 1831 – November 20, 1886) was an American  Civil War veteran, politician and a U.S. Representative from New York from 1883 until his death in 1886.

Biography
Born in Elmira, New York, Arnot was educated at private schools in his native city. He entered Yale College but left before graduation to enter business.

Career
Upon the death of his father, Arnot became engaged in banking in Elmira. He served as president of the village from 1859 to 1864 and as president of the board of trustees of the village of Elmira in 1859, 1860, and 1864. He married Ann Elizabeth Hulett and they had three children, John Hulett, Edward Munson, and Matthias Charles.

During the Civil War Arnot served as Army paymaster with the rank of major in Elmira. When the village was chartered as a city, he was elected mayor in 1864, 1870, and 1874. He declined the proffered nomination as Democratic candidate for Congress in 1882 but accepted nomination at a subsequent convention.

Arnot was elected as a Democrat to the Forty-eighth Congress as Representative for New York's twenty-ninth district, and the Forty-ninth Congress as Representative for New York's twenty-eighth district. He served from March 4, 1883, until his death.

Death and legacy
Arnot died in Elmira, Chemung County, New York, on November 20, 1886 (age 55 years, 254 days). He is interred at Woodlawn Cemetery, Elmira, New York.

Arnot was an active communicant at Trinity Church (Elmira, New York). A memorial chapel was built on the church campus in honor of him and his family with donations provided by his sister, Mariana Tuttle Arnot Ogden. She was the wife of William Butler Ogden, and she was also the major benefactor of the Arnot Ogden Hospital in Elmira.

See also
List of United States Congress members who died in office (1790–1899)

References

External links

1831 births
1886 deaths
Mayors of Elmira, New York
Union Army officers
Democratic Party members of the United States House of Representatives from New York (state)
Burials at Woodlawn Cemetery (Elmira, New York)
19th-century American politicians
Yale College alumni
Members of the United States House of Representatives from New York (state)